Johan Viktor (Voitto) Eloranta (6 July 1876 - 1923; original surname Lindroos) was a Finnish schoolteacher, journalist and politician, born in Janakkala. He was a member of the Parliament of Finland from 1907 to 1908 and again from 1909 to 1911, representing the Social Democratic Party of Finland (SDP). In 1918, during the Finnish Civil War, he was a member of the Staff of the Central Front of the Red side. After the collapse of the Finnish Socialist Workers' Republic, Eloranta fled to Soviet Russia, where he was among the founders of the Communist Party of Finland (SKP). He eventually joined the internal opposition of the SKP and in 1922, after the Kuusinen Club Incident, where eight Finnish communists were shot by members of the party opposition, he was sentenced to death by a Soviet tribunal, accused of being the main instigator of the incident. He was shot in 1923.

Eloranta was married with the playwright Elvira Willman who was also executed in Russia.

References

1876 births
1923 deaths
People from Janakkala
People from Häme Province (Grand Duchy of Finland)
Social Democratic Party of Finland politicians
Communist Party of Finland politicians
Members of the Parliament of Finland (1907–08)
Members of the Parliament of Finland (1909–10)
Members of the Parliament of Finland (1910–11)
Finnish educators
Finnish schoolteachers
People of the Finnish Civil War (Red side)
Finnish people executed by the Soviet Union